TIMES Celebex is the official rating of the Bollywood Stars in India and Worldwide. Based on various parameters T Score is calculated and the Bollywood actors and actresses ranked. The score and the ranking is a representation of the good influence and power of these stars over the audience.

T Score 
TIMES Celebex powered by Zoom calculates the ‘T Score’ based on the star's popularity, performance and visibility by measuring various parameters ranging from Box Office performance to PR buzz to Online following and more. 
Following are the key determinants of the T Score
 Box Office Returns and Recognition
 Ability to stay in the news across print and TV
 Visibility through Brand Endorsements on Print and TV
 Promotions of their upcoming movie releases on Print and TV
 Popularity among fans across mediums including the Internet and Social Media

TIMES Celebex is the most robust and factual ratings index for Bollywood celebrities as it is based on comprehensive data and hard facts rather than the subjective perception of a jury alone. Data is sourced from credible external agencies that service the media industry and collated from 60+ publications, 250+ TV channels, 10000+ cinema halls and millions of users across the Internet. Calculated month-on-month, TIMES Celebex is a dynamic index and hence a very current measure of a Celebrity’s power as opposed to any other one-time annual report.

Superlatives

Annual Compendium

TIMES Celebex Ranking

2012

List of Top 5 ranked Actors for 2017

List of Top 5 ranked Actresses for 2012

Summary 2012

2013

List of Top 5 ranked Actors for 2013

List of Top 5 ranked Actress for 2013

Summary 2013

Other Mention

2014

List of Top 5 ranked Actors for 2014.

List of Top 5 ranked Actress for 2014

Summary 2014

Other mention

2015

List of Top 5 ranked Actors for 2015

List of Top 5 ranked Actress for 2015

Summary 2015

2016

List of Top 5 ranked Actors for 2016

List of Top 5 ranked Actress for 2016

Times Celebex Awards

2014 Awards 
 Superstar of the year (male) : Salman Khan
 Superstar of the year (female) : Deepika Padukone
 Best in Brand endorsement (male) : Shah Rukh Khan 
 Best in Brand endorsement (female) : Katrina Kaif 
 Most followed on social media (male) : Amitabh Bachchan 
 Most followed on social media (female) : Deepika Padukone 
 Best Debut (male) : Tiger Shroff 
 Best Debut (female) : Kriti Sanon 
 Most Searched online (male) : Salman Khan 
 Most Searched online (female) : Sunny Leone 
 Most Popular in Print media (male) : Salman Khan 
 Most Popular in Print media (female) : Deepika Padukone 
 Box Office King : Salman Khan 
 Box Office Queen : Anushka Sharma

See also 
 Zoom
 Bollywood
 Cinema of India

References

External links 
 Times Celebex Official Site

Times Celebex: Bollywood Starsand#39; Rating